Strong Medicine is an American medical drama created by Whoopi Goldberg and Tammy Ader that aired on Lifetime from July 23, 2000 to February 5, 2006.

The show focused on Dr. Luisa "Lu" Delgado and Dr. Dana Stowe, two women who come together to run a women's clinic. After Janine Turner (Dana) exited the series, she was replaced later by Patricia Richardson and Rick Schroeder to be Lu's (Rosa Blasi) partner.

The series aired 133 episodes over the course of six seasons.

Series overview

Episodes

Season 1 (2000–01)

Season 2 (2001–02)

Season 3 (2002–03)

Season 4 (2003–04)

Season 5 (2004–05)

Season 6 (2005–06)

External links
 

Strong Medicine